was a district located in Shimane Prefecture, Japan.

In 2003 the population of the  district was estimated at 14,126, with a density of 47.06 persons per km2. The total area was 300.19 km2.

Towns and villages
 Hakuta
 Hirose

Merger
 On October 1, 2004 - the towns of Hakuta and Hirose were merged into the expanded city of Yasugi. Nogi District was dissolved as a result of this merger.

Former districts of Shimane Prefecture